The Ponte dei Tre Archi (Italian for "Three Arches' Bridge") is one of the main bridges of Venice, Italy, along with the Ponte delle Guglie, the other bridge spanning the Cannaregio Canal, and the four bridges spanning the Canal Grande: Rialto, Scalzi, Accademia, and the Costituzione. As all other Venetian bridges, the Ponte dei Tre Archi is  a pedestrian walkway.

The Baroque style bridge was designed in 1681 by Andrea Tirali, and is the sole three-arched bridge left in Venice. North of the bridge, towards the lagoon, is the former church of Santa Maria delle Penitenti and on the south is San Giobbe church located on its namesake square (campo).

References

Bridges completed in the 17th century
Tre
Pedestrian bridges in Italy